Abū al-Faḍl Jaʿfar ibn Muḥammad al-Muʿtaṣim bi-ʾllāh (March 822 – 11 December 861), better known by his regnal name al-Mutawakkil ʿalā Allāh ("He who relies on God") was the tenth Abbasid caliph. He succeeded his brother, al-Wathiq, and is known for expanding the empire to its maximum extent. He was deeply religious, and is remembered for discarding the Muʿtazila, ending the Mihna (a period of persecution of Islamic scholars), and releasing Ahmad ibn Hanbal. He is also known for his tough rule, especially with respect to non-Muslim subjects.  

He was assassinated on 11 December 861 by the Turkic guard with the support of his son, al-Muntasir, marking the beginning of the period of civil strife known as the "Anarchy at Samarra".

Early life
Al-Mutawakkil was born on February/March 822 to the Abbasid prince Abu Ishaq Muhammad (the future al-Mu'tasim) and a slave concubine from Khwarazm called Shuja. His early life is obscure, as he played no role in political affairs until the death of his older half-brother, al-Wathiq, in August 847.

Al-Mutawakkil was born during his uncle al-Ma'mun's reign. His full name was Jaʽfar ibn Muhammad and his Kunya was Abu al-Fadl. The young prince's early life coincided with what is called the golden age of the Abbasid Caliphate. During his youth his father was an important official of his uncle, caliph al-Ma'mun, who ruled until his death in 833. According to the account of al-Tabari, on his deathbed al-Ma'mun dictated a letter nominating his brother, rather than al-Abbas, as his successor, and Abu Ishaq was acclaimed as caliph on 9August, with the laqab of al-Mu'tasim (in full al-Muʿtaṣim bi’llāh, "he who seeks refuge in God"). His father became the eighth Abbasid caliph of the Caliphate in 833. His father ruled the caliphate for eight years and he was succeeded by his elder son al-Wathiq.

As a young prince Jaʿfar's first and elder son Muhammad (the future al-Muntasir) was born in 837. Al-Muntasir's mother was Hubshiya, a Greek Umm walad. At the time of his birth Jaʿfar was 14 years old. His other sons Ahmad (the future al-Mu'tamid) and Talha (the future al-Muwaffaq) were born in 842 and 843, respectively. The future al-Mu'tamid's mother was Kufan Umm walad called Fityan.

As a prince, Jaʿfar lead the pilgrims in 842 (the year of al-Wathiq's accession). Al-Wathiq's mother  Qaratis accompanied him, intending to make the pilgrimage, but she died in al-Hirah on 4th Dhu al-Qadah (14 August 842) and was buried in Kufah in the Abbasid palace of Dawud ibn Isa. Jaʿfar remained a courtier during his brother's reign.

Caliphate

Al-Wathiq's death was unexpected, and although he had a young son, he had not designated a successor. Consequently, the leading officials, the vizier Muhammad ibn al-Zayyat, the chief qādī, Ahmad ibn Abi Duwad, the Turkish generals Itakh and Wasif al-Turki, and a few others, assembled to determine his successor. Ibn al-Zayyat initially proposed al-Wathiq's son Muhammad (the future al-Muhtadi), but due to his youth he was passed over, and instead the council chose the 26-year-old Ja'far, who became the caliph al-Mutawakkil. The officials hoped that the new Caliph would prove a pliable puppet, like al-Wathiq. However, al-Mutawakkil was resolved to restore the authority of the caliphal office and restore its independence by destroying the coterie of civil and military officials, raised by his father, that effectively controlled the state.

Al-Mutawakkil's first target was the vizier ibn al-Zayyat, against whom he harboured a deep grudge over the way he had disrespected him in the past. According to al-Tabari, when al-Wathiq had grown angry and suspicious at his brother, al-Mutawakkil had visited the vizier in hopes of persuading him to intercede with the Caliph. Not only had ibn al-Zayyat kept the Abbasid prince waiting until he finished going through his correspondence, but even mocked him, in the presence of others, for coming to him seeking assistance. Not only that, but when the dejected prince left, ibn al-Zayyat wrote to the Caliph to complain about his appearance, noting that he was dressed in effeminate fashion, and that his hair was too long. As a result, al-Wathiq had his brother summoned to court. Al-Mutawakkil came in a brand-new court dress, hoping to mollify the Caliph, but instead al-Wathiq ordered that his hair be shorn off, and al-Mutawakkil be struck in the face with it. In later times, al-Mutawakkil confessed that he had never been so distressed by anything in his life than by this public humiliation. Thus, on 22 September 847, he sent Itakh to summon ibn al-Zayyat as if for an audience. Instead, the vizier was brought to Itakh's residence, where he was placed under house arrest. His possessions were confiscated, and he was tortured to death.

This was the apogee of Itakh's career: he combined the positions of chamberlain (ḥājib), head of the Caliph's personal guard, intendant of the palace, and head of the barīd, the public post, which doubled as the government's intelligence network. In 848, however, he was persuaded to go to the hajj, and laid down his powers, only to be arrested on his return. His possessions were confiscated—reportedly, in his house alone the Caliph's agents found one million gold dinars. He died of thirst in prison on 21 December 849.

He released from prison the famous jurist Ahmad ibn Hanbal ibn Hilal ibn Asad al-Shaybani, who opposed the Mutazilites in their opinion that the Quran was created. Ahmad ibn Hanbal, the founder of the Hanbali madhhab, was arrested and tortured throughout the reigns of, respectively, al-Ma'mun (813-833), his brother and al-Mutawakkil's father, al-Mutassim, and his son al-Wathiq.

One Mahmud ibn al-Faraj al-Nayshapuri arose claiming to be a prophet. He and some followers were arrested in Baghdad. He was imprisoned, beaten and, on 18 June 850, he died.

In A.H. 236 (850), al-Mutawakkil issued a decree requiring all Christians and Jews in his realm, including Jerusalem and Caesarea, to wear a yellow (honey-colored) hood and belt to distinguish them from Muslims.

In A.H. 237 (851–852), Armenians rebelled and defeated and killed the Abbasid governor. Al-Mutawakkil sent his general Bugha al-Kabir to handle this. Bugha scored successes during this year; the following year, he attacked and burned Tiflis, capturing Ishaq ibn Isma'il. The rebel leader was later executed. That year (A.H. 238) the Byzantines attacked Damietta.

In A.H. 240 (854–855), the police chief in Homs killed a prominent person stirring an uprising. He was driven out. Al-Mutawakkil offered another police chief. When the next year saw a revolt against this new police chief, al-Mutawakkil had this firmly suppressed. As Christians had joined in the second round of disturbances, the caliph had Christians expelled from Homs.

Also in 241 occurred the firm response to the revolt by the Beja people, who lived beyond Upper Egypt. They had been paying a tax on their gold mines. They ceased paying this, drove out Muslims working in the mines and terrified people in Upper Egypt. Al-Mutawakkil sent al-Qummi to restore order. Al-Qummi sent seven ships with supplies that enabled him to persevere despite the very harsh terrain of this distant territory. He retook the mines, pressed on to the Beja royal stronghold and defeated the king in battle. The Beja resumed payment of the tax.

On 23 February 856, there was an exchange of captives with the Byzantine Empire. A second such exchange took place some four years later.

Al-Mutawakkil's reign is remembered for its many reforms and viewed as a golden age of the Abbasids. He would be the last great Abbasid caliph; after his death the dynasty would fall into a decline.

Religious policy
Al-Mutawakkil decided to diverge away from the religious policies of the previous caliphs, opting instead to put a stop to the controversy over whether the Qur'an was created or uncreated, ultimately putting an end to the doctrinal regime that had been in place since 833. 
Al-Mutawakkil spent the next several years taking hostile steps against the Mu'tazilites, dismissing a number of Ibn Abi Du'ad's qadis from office and ordering an end to debate over the nature of the Qur'an.

The caliph also attempted to reconcile with Ahmad ibn Hanbal (died 855) and removed Ahmad ibn Nasr's body from public display, and finally, in March 852, he ordered that all prisoners held on account of the Inquisition be released, thereby largely bringing a close to the mihna period.

Al-Mutawakkil appointed famous Arab Islamic scholar Yahya ibn Aktham as Chief judge (Qadi al-qudat) in 851, he remained in office until al-Mutawakkil deposed him in 854. 
Ja'far ibn Abd al-Wahid al-Hashimi was appointed as chief judge (qadi al-qudat) by al-Mutawakkil in July 854 as a replacement for Yahya ibn Aktham.

In 850 al-Mutawakkil made a decree ordering Dhimmi (Christians and Jews) to wear garments to distinguish them from Muslims, that their places of worship be destroyed and demonic effigies nailed to the doors, and that they be allowed little involvement in government or official matters.

Mutawakkil ordered the ancient sacred Cypress of the Zoroastrians, the Cypress of Kashmar, to be cut down in order to use it in constructing his new palace despite the enormous protests from the Zoroastrian community. The cypress, more than 1400 years old at the time, was of legendary value to the Zoroastrians, believed to be brought from Paradise to the earth by Zoroaster. Al-Mutawakkil was killed before the cypress wood arrived for his new palace.

Accomplishments

Al-Mutawakkil was unlike his brother and father in that he was not known for having a thirst for knowledge, but he had an eye for magnificence and a hunger to build. The Great Mosque of Samarra was, at its time, the largest mosque in the world; its minaret is a vast spiralling cone 55 m high with a spiral ramp. The mosque had 17 aisles and its wall were panelled with mosaics of dark blue glass.

The Great Mosque was just part of an extension of Samarra eastwards that built upon part of the walled royal hunting park. Al-Mutawakkil built as many as 20 palaces (the numbers vary in documents). Samarra became one of the largest cities of the ancient world; even the archaeological site of its ruins is one of the world's most extensive.
The Caliph's building schemes extended in A.H. 245 (859–860) to a new city, al-Jaʻfariyya, which al-Mutawakkil built on the Tigris some eighteen kilometres from Samarra. Al-Mutawakkil ordered a canal to be built to divert water from the Tigris, entrusting the project to two courtiers, who ignored the talents of a local engineer of repute and entrusted the work to al-Farghanī, the great astronomer and writer. Al-Farghanī, who was not a specialist in public works, made a miscalculation and it appeared that the opening of the canal was too deep so that water from the river would only flow at near full flood.

News leaked to the infuriated caliph might have meant the heads of all concerned save for the gracious actions of the engineer, Sind ibn ʻAlī, who vouched for the eventual success of the project, thus risking his own life. Al-Mutawakkil was assassinated shortly before the error became public.

Al-Mutawakkil was keen to involve himself in many religious debates, something that would show in his actions against different minorities. His father had tolerated the Shīʻa Imām who taught and preached at Medina, and for the first years of his reign al-Mutawakkil continued the policy. Imām ʻAlī al-Hadī's growing reputation inspired a letter from the Governor of Medina, ʻAbdu l-Lāh ibn Muħammad, suggesting that a coup was being plotted, and al-Mutawakkil extended an invitation to Samarra to the Imām, an offer he could not refuse. In Samarra, the Imām was kept under virtual house arrest and spied upon. However, no excuse to take action against him ever appeared. After al-Mutawakkil's death, his successor had the Imām poisoned: al-Hadī is buried at Samarra. The general Shīʻa population faced repression. and this was embodied in the destruction of the shrine of Hussayn ibn ʻAlī, an action that was carried out ostensibly in order to stop pilgrimages to that site, and the flogging and incarceration of the Alid Yahya ibn Umar.

The caliph al-Mutawakkil had created a plan of succession that would allow his sons to inherit the caliphate after his death; he would be succeeded first by his eldest son, al-Muntasir, then by al-Mu'tazz and third by al-Mu'ayyad.

Also during his reign, al-Mutawakkil met the famous Byzantine theologian Cyril the Philosopher, who was sent to tighten the diplomatic relations between the Empire and the Caliphate in a state mission by the Emperor Michael III.
Of his sons, al-Muntasir succeeded him and ruled until his death in 862, al-Mu'tazz reigned as Caliph from 866 to his overthrow in 869, and al-Mu'tamid reigned as Caliph in 870–892 with his brother al-Muwaffaq serving as an effective regent of the realm until his death in 891.

Family
Al-Mutawakkil's only wife was Faridah. She belonged to the household of his brother Caliph al-Wathiq, who kept her as a concubine and favorite although she belonged to the singer Amr ibn Banah. When al-Wathiq died, Amr presented her to al-Mutawakkil. He married her, and she became one of his favorites. One of his concubines was Hubshiya. She was a Greek, and was the mother of his eldest son, the future Caliph al-Muntasir. Another of his concubines was Ishaq. She was an Andulasian, and was one of his favorites. She was the mother of his sons Ibrahim al-Mu'ayyad and Abu Ahmad (the future regent al-Muwaffaq). Another concubine was Fityan. She was from Kufa, and was mother of the future Caliph al-Mu'tamid. Another concubine was Qabiha. She was a Greek, and was the mother of the future caliph al-Mu'tazz and Isma'il. Another concubine was Fadl. She was a poetess, born in al-Yamama. She was from Abd al-Qays tribe. She was purchased by Muhammad ibn al-Faraj al-Rukhkhaji, who gave her to al-Mutawakkil. She died in 870–71. Another concubine was Bunan. She was also a poetess. Another concubine was Mahbubah. She was a poetess and a songstress. She had been given to al-Mutawakkil by Ubaydullah ibn Tahir, when he became caliph, as one of a group of four hundred slaves. Another concubine was Nashib, a songstress.

Death

Al-Mutawakkil continued to rely on Turkic statesmen and slave soldiers to put down rebellions and lead battles against foreign empires, notably the Byzantines. His secretary, al-Fath ibn Khaqan, who was Turkic, was a famous figure of al-Mutawakkil's era. His reliance on Turkic soldiers would come back to haunt him. Al-Mutawakkil would have his Turkic commander-in-chief killed. This, coupled with his extreme attitudes towards the Shia, made his popularity decline rapidly.

Al-Mutawakkil had appointed his oldest son, al-Muntasir, as his heir in 849/50, but slowly had shifted his favour to his second son, al-Mu'tazz, encouraged by al-Fath ibn Khaqan and the vizier Ubayd Allah ibn Yahya ibn Khaqan. This rivalry extended into the political sphere, as al-Mu'tazz's succession appears to have been backed by the traditional Abbasid elites as well, while al-Muntasir was backed by the Turkic and Maghariba guard troops. In late autumn 861, matters came to a head: in October, al-Mutawakkil ordered the estates of the Turkic general Wasif to be confiscated and handed over to al-Fath. Feeling backed into a corner, the Turkic leadership began a plot to assassinate the Caliph. They were soon joined, or at least had the tacit approval, of al-Muntasir, who smarted from a succession of humiliations: on 5 December, on the recommendation of al-Fath and Ubayd Allah, he was bypassed in favour of al-Mu'tazz for leading the Friday prayer at the end of Ramadan, while three days later, when al-Mutawakkil was feeling ill and chose al-Muntasir to represent him on the prayer, once again Ubayd Allah intervened and persuaded the Caliph to go in person. Even worse, according to al-Tabari, on the next day al-Mutawakkil alternately vilified and threatened to kill his eldest son, and even had al-Fath slap him on the face. With rumours circulating that Wasif and the other Turkish leaders would be rounded up and executed on 12 December, the conspirators decided to act.

According to al-Tabari, a story later circulated that al-Fath and Ubayd Allah were forewarned of the plot by a Turkic woman, but had disregarded it, confident that no-one would dare carry it out. On the night of 10/11 December, about one hour after midnight, the Turks burst in the chamber where the Caliph and al-Fath were having supper. Al-Fath was killed trying to protect the Caliph, who was killed next. Al-Muntasir, who now assumed the caliphate, initially claimed that al-Fath had murdered his father, and that he had been killed after; within a short time, however, the official story changed to al-Mutawakkil choking on his drink. The murder of al-Mutawakkil began the tumultuous period known as "Anarchy at Samarra", which lasted until 870 and brought the Abbasid Caliphate to the brink of collapse.

Legacy

The Caliphate of al-Mutawakkil is remembered for its many reforms and viewed as a golden age of the Abbasids. He would be the last great Abbasid caliph; after his death the dynasty would fall into a decline. After his death, the Caliphate built by Rashidun, Umayyad and Early Abbasids also declined as a world power. 

Al-Mutawakkil was praised by many contemporary scholars.
The famous scholar al-Taymi said:

Ali ibn al-Jahm said:

Ali ibn Ismail said:

Al-Mutawakkil nominated his three son as heir. Al-Muntasir was nominated first, al-Mu'tazz was nominated second heir and third was al-Mu'ayyad.
Al-Muntasir became caliph on 11 December 861, after his father al-Mutawakkil was assassinated by members of his Turkic guard. Although he was suspected of being involved in the plot to kill al-Mutawakkil, he was able to quickly take control of affairs in the capital city of Samarra and receive the oath of allegiance from the leading men of the state. Al-Muntasir's sudden elevation to the Caliphate served to benefit several of his close associates, who gained senior positions in the government after his ascension. Included among these were his secretary, Ahmad ibn al-Khasib, who became vizier, and Wasif, a senior Turkic general who had likely been heavily involved in al-Mutawakkil's murder. His reign lasted less than half a year; it ended with his death from unknown causes on Sunday, 7 June 862, at the age of 24 years. During al-Muntasir's short reign (r. 861–862), the Turks pressured him into removing al-Mu'tazz and al-Mu'ayyad from the succession. When al-Muntasir died, the Turkic officers gathered together and decided to install the dead caliph's cousin al-Musta'in (Son of his brother Muhammad) on the throne. The new caliph was almost immediately faced with a large riot in Samarra in support of the disenfranchised al-Mu'tazz; the rioters were put down by the military but casualties on both sides were heavy. Al-Musta'in, worried that al-Mu'tazz or al-Mu'ayyad could press their claims to the caliphate, first attempted to buy them off and then threw them in prison. In 866 his nephew al-Musta'in was killed by his son al-Mu'tazz after Fifth Fitna. Al-Mu'tazz's reign marks the apogee of the decline of the Caliphate's central authority, and the climax of centrifugal tendencies, expressed through the emergence of the autonomous dynasties in Abbasid Caliphate. Finally, unable to meet the financial demands of the Turkic troops, in mid-July a palace coup deposed al-Mu'tazz. He was imprisoned and maltreated to such an extent that he died after three days, on 16 July 869. He was succeeded by his cousin al-Muhtadi. He ruled until 870, until he was murdered on 21 June 870, and replaced by his cousin, al-Mu'tamid.

References

Sources

External links

Imam Haadi and al-Mutawakkil 
The great mosque at Samarra
al-Mutawakkil's decree of 850 (English)
al-Farghani and the canal 

822 births
861 deaths
Arab Muslims
9th-century rulers in Africa
9th-century Abbasid caliphs
Assassinated caliphs
9th-century murdered monarchs
Mu'tazilism
One Thousand and One Nights characters
Sons of Abbasid caliphs